West Coast (foaled May 14, 2014) is a retired American Thoroughbred racehorse, foaled, raised and sold by historic Thoroughbred nursery, Hermitage Farm. Unraced at age two, he was named the Champion three-year-old colt of 2017 after wins in the Travers Stakes and Pennsylvania Derby, plus a third-place finish in the Breeders' Cup Classic. At age four, he finished second in the Pegasus World Cup, Dubai World Cup and Awesome Again Stakes. He finished his career with a record of six wins from 13 starts and earnings of $5,803,800.

Background
West Coast was bred in Kentucky by Carl Pollard's CFP Thoroughbreds LLC and was foaled and raised at Hermitage Farm. His sire was Flatter, who won four of six starts but finished third in his only stakes appearance. As a well bred son of leading sire A.P. Indy and notable broodmare Praise, Flatter was given a chance at stud by his owners, Claiborne Farm, and developed into a solid sire. West Coast's dam Caressing was the champion two-year-old filly of 2000.

West Coast was sold by Hermitage Farm at the Keeneland September 2015 Yearling Sale to agent Ben Glass for Gary and Mary West. The Wests were not normally interested in late foals and West Coast had been foaled on May 14, after their normal cut-off date. "But I just loved this colt," said Glass. "He was so charismatic and carried himself so well. He had such a fluid walk he would slink along like a panther. He had good size and a great big overstep on him." Glass set a price limit of $350,000 for the colt but eventually went to $425,000.

West Coast was trained by Hall of Famer Bob Baffert.

Racing career

2017: three-year-old season
West Coast did not race at age two because Baffert felt the colt needed more time to develop. He finally made his racing debut as a three-year-old on February 18, 2017 in a maiden special weight race at Santa Anita, where he finished second. He broke his maiden in his second start on March 12, then was stepped up to graded stakes company in the Lexington Stakes at Keeneland in Kentucky on April 16. Drawing post position 10, he raced near the back of the pack during the early running and was carried five wide into the first turn. He started to make up ground while going four wide around the far turn and moved into the lead mid-stretch but was caught in the final strides to lose by a head.

He then returned to Santa Anita where he won on allowance race on May 20 before being shipped across country to Belmont Park for the Easy Goer Stakes on June 10. After settling near the back of the field for the first half mile, he made a strong move down the stretch to win by  lengths. "We thought he'd run well," Baffert said. "We were debating running in the Belmont [Stakes]. He didn't convince us yet, but he's figuring it out. He's really developing the right way."

West Coast returned to California to make his next start in the Los Alamitos Derby on July 15. Going off as the odds-on favorite, he made a "leisurely" run down the backstretch while sitting in fifth place but swept by the early leaders in the stretch to win by  lengths. "It was sort of a gamble to sit back there, but it paid off", said Baffert. "Then when he turned for home I said, 'I think we're OK.' He's a good horse and it's a long stretch. All of a sudden he just took off, getting into stride."

West Coast then traveled to Saratoga Race Course in upstate New York for the prestigious Travers Stakes on August 26. The field for the so-called "Midsummer Derby" featured nine graded stakes winners, including Always Dreaming (Kentucky Derby), Cloud Computing (Preakness Stakes) and Tapwrit (Belmont Stakes). Baffert chose to remain back in California, leaving the colt under the care of assistant trainer Jimmy Barnes. Before the race, Baffert texted jockey Mike Smith to ride West Coast like he was Smith's own horse. Given the lack of early speed horses in the race, Smith changed tactics and went to the early lead followed closely by Always Dreaming. "I thought there wasn't much pace, but man, I caught a good jump, put him on the lead, and he just cruised from there", said Smith.

West Coast set moderate fractions with Always Dreaming pressing the pace to his outside down the backstretch. Around the far turn, Always Dreaming faded but Gunnevera and Irap closed ground to challenge. Gunnevera closed to within half a length at the top of the stretch before West Coast responded to again draw away, winning by  lengths. "He was a happy horse all the way around there", said Smith. "There was a time or two when they came to me, but he just put them away, and every time they would, he'd take a big old breath of air."

The result gave Baffert back-to-back wins in the Travers, the first trainer to repeat in the race since Shug McGaughey in 1989-90. Baffert had won in 2016 with Arrogate, who like West Coast had been a late developing colt who Baffert gave time to develop. Baffert had also finished second in the 2015 Travers with Triple Crown champion American Pharoah.

Now considered one of the top colts in the three-year-old division, West Coast made his next start in the Pennsylvania Derby where he went off as the odds-on favorite. Smith settled West Coast just behind the early leader Outplay, then moved to the lead rounding into the stretch. Irap closed from midpack to finish second but never challenged West Coast, who won by  lengths. "He's just better than they are", said Smith. "As a matter of fact, he was getting bored."

On November 4, West Coast faced older horses for the first time in the Breeders' Cup Classic. The 9-5 morning-line favorite was Gun Runner, who had won three Grade I races in a row. The next four betting choices were all trained by Baffert: Arrogate (Pegasus World Cup, Dubai World Cup) at 2-1, West Coast at 6-1, Collected (Pacific Classic) at 6-1, and Mubtaahij (Awesome Again Stakes) at 12-1. With none of the Baffert horses eager to set the pace, Gun Runner went to the early lead, then shrugged off a challenge from Collected on the far turn to win impressively. West Coast tracked the leaders and held off a late challenge to finish third.

On January 25, 2018, West Coast was voted 2017 American Champion Three-Year-Old Male Horse.

2018: four-year-old season
West Coast made the first start of his four-year-old campaign on January 27, 2018 in the Pegasus World Cup at Gulfstream Park. He rated in fourth place behind the early pace set by Collected and Gun Runner, then made his move on the final turn. However, he could not keep pace with Gun Runner and finished second, though well clear of the rest of the field. "Turning for home I thought Gun Runner might be a little empty, but his tank is so big and he just kept going," said Baffert. "I can't really complain. We just got beat by a really good horse. He was tested the whole way around there. It was a good horse race. I just came up a little short."

West Coast next shipped to Meydan Racecourse for the Dubai World Cup, held on March 31. He dueled for the early lead with Thunder Snow, but started to lose contact around the final turn and eventually finished  lengths behind in second.

After returning to America, West Coast was turned out for several weeks before resuming training in the summer. He returned to racing on September 29 in the Awesome Again Stakes where he again finished second, this time to Accelerate. "He really ran a huge race," said new jockey Mike Smith. "I really couldn't ask for more out of him. He really needed that push, and we forced him to move forward a little more, but I think that he did it well, and it was good for him."

West Coast made his final start in the 2018 Breeders' Cup Classic on November 3 at Churchill Downs. He vied for the early lead but eventually tired and finished seventh.

Retirement
West Coast entered stud at Lane's End Farm in 2019. His first foals will be of racing age in 2022.

Statistics

Pedigree

West Coast is inbred 4 x 4 to Raise a Native, meaning that stallion appears twice in the fourth generation of his pedigree.

References

2014 racehorse births
Racehorses bred in Kentucky
Racehorses trained in the United States
Thoroughbred family 9-f
Grade 1 stakes race winners
Eclipse Award winners